was a retainer of the Japanese Imagawa clan during the Sengoku period of the 16th century. During the Battle of Okehazama in 1560, Naomori was killed while trying to protect his lord, Imagawa Yoshimoto during the attack led by Oda Nobunaga, who surprised his enemy when he attacked in thick fog following a hard rain. His childhood name was Toramatsu (虎松).

Naomori's daughter was Ii Naotora who succeeded him as head of the Ii clan. Later, Naotora adopted Ii Naomasa as her son, who become one of the Four Guardian Kings of Tokugawa Ieyasu.

Family
 Father: Ii Naomune
 Mother: Joshin’in
 Wife: Yugiri (d.1578)
 Daughter: Ii Naotora
 Adopted son: Ii Naochika

References
II Naomasa (Naomori's grandson)
Ii Naomori 

1526 births
1560 deaths
Samurai
Japanese warriors killed in battle
Ii clan